Events in the year 1928 in India.

Incumbents
 Emperor of India – George V
 Viceroy of India – The Lord Irwin
 British officer John Saunders Murder 17 dec.

Events
 National income - 33,517 million
 February – the Simon Commission lands in India
 May – India wins Hockey Gold Medal at the Amsterdam Olympics – Games of the IXth Olympiad.
 28 August - Nehru Report
 December – Board of Control for Cricket in India is formed.
 Undated – Kherwadi Social Welfare Association is founded.

Law

Births
1 January – Khan Mohammad, Pakistani cricketer (d. 2009)
5 January – Girish Chandra Saxena, politician (d. 2017)
6 January – Vijay Tendulkar, playwright, movie and television writer, literary essayist, political journalist and social commentator (died 2008).
27 March – Rajagopalan Krishnamurthy, cotton researcher
10 April – Ashok Mitra, economist and politician (d. 2018 )
28 June – Chennaveera Kanavi, Kannada poet and author (d. 2022)
1 July – Ram Naresh Yadav, politician (d. 2016)
8 July – Balakh Sher Mazari, Pakistani politician, interim prime minister (d. 2022)
14 July – Bedabrata Barua, politician
15 July – Viramachaneni Vimla Devi, Indian parliamentarian (d. 1967)
19 July – Lal Chand, long-distance runner
24 July – Keshubhai Patel, Indian politician (d. 2020)
5 August – Dinesh Chandra Joarder, Indian politician (d. 2018)
28 August – Mambillikalathil Govind Kumar Menon, physicist and policymaker. (died 2016)
12 September – M. V. Rajasekharan, politician and Minister. (died 2020)
 1 October – Sivaji Ganesan, actor (died 2001)
27 October – Datta Gaekwad, cricketer
28 November – Bano Qudsia, Pakistani writer (d. 2017)
20 December – Motilal Vora, politician, Chief Minister of Uttar Pradesh (d. 2020)
22 December – Naresh Kumar, tennis player (d. 2022)
31 December – Jaggayya, actor (died 2004).

Full date unknown
J. V. Somayajulu, actor (died 2004).

Deaths
1 July – Nanda Kishore Bal, poet (born 1875).
 Sree Narayana Guru attained eternity (born 1956) at Shivagiri Mutt, Varkala, Kollam in Kerala, South India.
 17 Nov -Lala Lajpat Rai, Indian Punjabi author and politician (born 28 January 1865).

References

 
India
Years of the 20th century in India